Zwicker may refer to:

People with the surname
Andrew Zwicker, New Jersey Assemblyman representing the 16th Legislative District
Barrie Wallace Zwicker, Canadian alternative media journalist, documentary producer, and political activist
Christina Zwicker, Croatian artistic gymnast
Eberhard Zwicker, German acoustics scientist and full professor at the Technical University Munich
Edward Zwicker, Nova Scotian merchant and political figure
Marguerite Porter Zwicker, Canadian watercolor painter and art promoter
Steven N. Zwicker, American literary scholar and Washington University Professor
William S. Zwicker, an American mathematician and the William D. Williams Professor of Mathematics at Union College in Schenectady, New York

Games
Zwicker (card game), a north German card game for 2-4 players

German-language surnames